Elvis Thomas (born 6 June 1994) is an Antiguan footballer.

Club career
Thomas made his professional debut for Antigua Barracuda FC on April 17, 2011 in a 2-1 loss to the Los Angeles Blues.

International career
Thomas is an Antiguan youth international, having played for both the Antigua and Barbuda U-17 and U-20 national teams.

References

External links
 
 

1994 births
Living people
Antigua and Barbuda footballers
Antigua and Barbuda international footballers
SAP F.C. players
Antigua Barracuda F.C. players
TT Pro League players
Morvant Caledonia United players
USL Championship players
Expatriate footballers in Trinidad and Tobago
Association football forwards
Antigua and Barbuda under-20 international footballers
Antigua and Barbuda youth international footballers